Stella Chitty  (11 March 1928 – 17 June 2005) was a British stage manager. In her 47-year career with the Royal Opera House, she rose to become the general stage manager.

Stella Chitty was born in Brixton, London on 11 March 1928.

Chitty joined the Royal Opera House in 1950, and rose to become the general stage manager.

Chitty started as a secretary in 1950, and soon became an assistant to stage manager Ande Anderson, and then deputy to David Peacock in 1958. From 1964 to 1993, she served as the general stage manager.

Chitty married William Bundy, lighting director, and later technical director, of the Royal Opera House, and secondly Jack Stirling-Wakeley, principal percussionist with the Orchestra of the Royal Opera House. She was appointed an OBE in 1992. Chitty died in London on 17 June 2005.

References

1928 births
2005 deaths
Royal Opera House
People from Brixton
Officers of the Order of the British Empire
Stage managers